William Preston Graves (born January 9, 1953) is an American former politician who was the 43rd governor of Kansas from 1995 until 2003.

Career

Graves was born in Salina, Kansas to parents who owned a trucking firm. After graduating from Kansas Wesleyan University with a business degree, he worked in human resources. In 1986, he was elected Kansas Secretary of State and in 1991, he was appointed as a representative of state governments to the Competitiveness Policy Council.

He defeated Democratic Congressman Jim Slattery in the Republican sweeping elections of 1994 at the age of 41, and became one of the youngest governors in Kansas history. A moderate Republican, Graves was known for his disputes with the conservative wing of the Kansas Republican Party. His term of office saw strong economic growth for Kansas after years of recession, and a continued emphasis on education. In 1997 Graves served as the Chairman of the Midwestern Governors Association.

He won re-election in 1998 with 74% of the vote, which was the largest margin of victory by any governor up for election in 1998, and one of the largest margins of victory in Kansas gubernatorial history. Graves was barred from running for a third term as governor by Kansas state law, and was succeeded by Democrat Kathleen Sebelius in January 2003. Serving with him as lieutenant governor were Sheila Frahm (1995–1996), whom he appointed to fill Bob Dole's seat in the Senate, and Gary Sherrer (1996–2003).

Following his tenure as governor, he has served as president of the American Trucking Associations.

Personal life
Bill Graves married Linda Richey in 1990, they have one daughter.

References

External links
 Kansas.gov/
 
 Nga.org/
Publications concerning Kansas Governor Graves's administration available via the KGI Online Library

|-

|-

|-

Methodists from Kansas
Republican Party governors of Kansas
Kansas Wesleyan University alumni
Living people
Politicians from Salina, Kansas
Secretaries of State of Kansas
1953 births
20th-century American politicians
21st-century American politicians